The 1921 Geneva Covenanters football team was an American football team that represented Geneva College as an independent during the 1921 college football season. Led by Philip Henry Bridenbaugh in his fifth and final year as head coach, the team compiled a record of 5–3–1.

Schedule

References

Geneva
Geneva Golden Tornadoes football seasons
Geneva Covenanters football